Akurdet Subregion is a subregion in the western Gash-Barka region (Zoba Gash-Barka) of Eritrea. Its capital lies at Akurdet.

References

Awate.com: Martyr Statistics

Gash-Barka Region
Subregions of Eritrea